H. B. Tanner (March 16. 1922 – March 12, 2020) was an American businessman and politician.

Hugh Bernard Tanner was born in Carrier Mills, Saline County, Illinois. He graduated from the Eldorado Township High School in Eldorado, Illinois. Tanner also graduated from the College of Mortuary Science in St. Louis, Missouri. He served in the United States Army during World War II and the Korean War. He lived in Harrisburg, Illinois with his wife and family. Tanner owned a funeral home in Eldorado, Illinois. He was also in the construction and real estate businesses. Tanner served as sheriff of Saline County, from 1958 to 1962, and was a Democrat. Tahher served in the Illinois House of Representatives in 1965 and 1966. Tanner died at the VA Medical Center in Marion, Illinois.

Notes

1922 births
2020 deaths
People from Saline County, Illinois
Military personnel from Illinois
Businesspeople from Illinois
American funeral directors
Illinois sheriffs
Democratic Party members of the Illinois House of Representatives
United States Army personnel of World War II